John Dolan (September 12, 1867 in Newport, Kentucky – May 8, 1948 in Springfield, Ohio) was a pitcher in Major League Baseball.

Sources

1867 births
1948 deaths
Baseball players from Kentucky
Major League Baseball pitchers
Cincinnati Reds players
Columbus Solons players
Washington Senators (1891–1899) players
St. Louis Browns (NL) players
Chicago Colts players
19th-century baseball players
Chattanooga Lookouts managers
Minneapolis Millers (baseball) players
Evansville Hoosiers players
Denver Mountaineers players
Albany Senators players
Elmira Gladiators players
Rochester Flour Cities players
Providence Grays (minor league) players
Nashville Tigers players
Rockford Forest City players
Rockford Reds players
Lancaster Maroons players
Springfield Governors players
Wheeling Stogies players
Grand Rapids Furniture Makers players
Springfield Wanderers players
Columbus Senators players
Schenectady Electricians players
San Antonio Bronchos players
Elkhart (minor league baseball) players
Hamilton (minor league baseball) players